The Chen Dexing Ancestral Hall is an ancestral shrine in Datong District, Taipei, Taiwan.

History
The hall was originally built in 1892 during the reign of Guangxu Emperor. The hall was confiscated by the Japanese government to make the Office of the Governor-General of Taiwan at the original site along with Lin Family Ancestral Hall. The hall was then rebuilt in 1911 at its present location.

Architecture
The hall was designed by Ch'en Ing-pin using southern Fukienese architectural style. There is a double dragon column in front of the hall.

Transportation
The hall is accessible within walking distance southwest of Shuanglian Station of Taipei Metro.

See also
 Chinese ancestral veneration
 Taipei Confucius Temple
 Dalongdong Baoan Temple
 Taipei Xia-Hai City God Temple
 List of temples in Taiwan
 List of tourist attractions in Taiwan

References

1892 establishments in Taiwan
Ancestral shrines in Taiwan
Buildings and structures in Taipei
Religious buildings and structures completed in 1892